Five Boys from Barska Street is a 1954 Polish drama film directed by Aleksander Ford, based on the 1952 novel of the same name by Kazimierz Koźniewski. It was awarded the International Prize at the 1954 Cannes Film Festival.

Plot
Five young men have lost their ideals during the Nazi occupation. They then decided to make a living by stealing. After they have been caught and convicted they decided to become a legitimate crime organisation. In the process they get themselves in a lot of trouble including getting unwittingly involved in terrorism activities .

Cast
 Aleksandra Śląska - Hanka
 Tadeusz Janczar - Kazek Spokorny
 Andrzej Kozak - Jacek Siwicki
 Tadeusz Łomnicki - Lutek Kozłowski
 Marian Rułka - Zbyszek Moczarski
 Włodzimierz Skoczylas - Franek Kruk
 Mieczysław Stoor - Marek Kozioł
 Jadwiga Chojnacka - Kazek's Aunt
 Maria Kierzkowa - Edwardowa
 Ewa Krasnodebska - Maria Radziszewska
 Zofia Malynicz - Radziszewska
 Hanna Skarzanka - Judge
 Natalia Szymanska - Koziołowa
 Ludwik Benoit - Wojciechowski

References

External links
 

1954 films
Polish drama films
1950s Polish-language films
1954 drama films
Films directed by Aleksander Ford
Films based on Polish novels